The women's 4 × 400 metres relay at the 2022 World Athletics Indoor Championships took place on 20 March 2022.

Summary
The United States was the fastest qualifying team from the morning heats but it was Junelle Bromfield from the slowest qualifying team, Jamaica who appeared to take a slight lead through the first two turns.  From the cones, Lieke Klaver, running her fifth fast 400 metres within about 56 hours, accelerated Netherlands past Bromfield to take the lead at the bell.   USA's Na'Asha Robinson tried to get past Klaver but was held off, forced to running wide through the penultimate turn.  Bromfield then went by on the inside, chasing after Klaver.  Then Natalia Kaczmarek came up to put Poland into third place before the handoff.  Eveline Saalberg held off Janieve Russell as the field stayed in the same order through three turns.  Saalberg began to tie up, Russell went by and extended a big lead for Jamaica.  Taking the baton in fourth place, Brittany Aveni went around Poland's Kinga Gacka and Netherlands' Lisanne de Witte and closed down the lead of Roneisha McGregor.  Aveni couldn't get past McGregor, Gacka followed and took the rail immediately behind McGregor, forcing Aveni wide.  Ginka slowed on the final turn, Aveni still couldn't get by McGregor by the handoff.  The anchor leg was a rematch of the 400, with Jamaica's bronze medalist Stephenie Ann McPherson getting away in the lead, USA was next in line with semi-finalist Lynna Irby, followed by Poland with 3rd place Justyna Święty-Ersetic, also in her fifth race in the same time span, and in fourth place, Netherlands' silver medalist Femke Bol.  They ran in that order, single file, chased by GBR's Jessie Knight until the final straightaway.  McPherson came off the turn wide into lane 2 to protect her lead.  This forced Irby to the outside of lane 2 looking for running room to pass.  Święty-Ersetic went to lane 3 to run past Irby which opened up lane one for Bol.  20 metres before the finish it was the three, dead even, shoulder to shoulder across the track, battling for the silver medal 2 steps behind McPherson.  Bol was the fastest to the line, barely ahead of Święty-Ersetic who had gotten past Irby, the three separated by about half a metre.

Results

Heats
Qualification: First 2 in each heat (Q) and the next 2 fastest (q) advance to the Final.

The heats were started at 11:45.

Final
The final was started at 19:55.

References

4 x 400 metres relay
4 × 400 metres relay at the World Athletics Indoor Championships